Mary A. Anderson is the pseudonym that was used by an unknown woman who committed suicide in a Seattle, Washington hotel room in October 1996. Investigations by multiple agencies have failed to identify her.

Death and discovery of the body 
On October 9, the woman reserved a room by telephone at the Hotel Vintage Park, 1100 5th Avenue, about 90 minutes before checking in. She arrived with two bags and paid cash for two nights. In the hotel's register, she entered the name "Mary A. Anderson," along with a New York City address and a telephone number, all of which investigators later determined to be false.

On October 11, her body was discovered by hotel staff after she failed to check out. She was found reclining in the bed, clasping a Bible to her chest with the pages open to Psalm 23. A suicide note was found on the bedside table. She left no identification. The Medical Examiner later determined she had consumed a lethal mixture of Metamucil and cyanide and ruled her death a suicide. 
Her suicide note read:

"To Whom It May Concern.

I have decided to end my life and no one is responsible for my death.

Mary Anderson.

P.S. I have no relatives. You can use my body as you choose."

She was white, estimated to be between in her mid-30s to early 50s, and well-groomed with manicured nails and neatly combed hair. She had a copper intrauterine device inserted and she appeared to have had breast surgery at some point in her life.

Investigation

When her hotel registration information proved false, investigators unsuccessfully attempted to identify her through fingerprint records on file with the FBI, as well as through missing person reports filed in the U.S., Canada, and through Interpol. They were also unable to trace the origins of the cyanide she had used to end her life. The medical examiner’s office stated that the woman had "intentionally obliterated" any means of identification.

Othram Inc. was contacted to assist with her identification in May 2021.

See also
 Lyle Stevik, discovered in Aberdeen, Washington in 2001 after using an alias prior to his suicide.
 List of unidentified decedents in the United States

References

External links
 
 

20th-century births
1996 deaths
Unidentified decedents in the United States
Suicides by cyanide poisoning
Suicides in Washington (state)
1996 suicides
Female suicides
1990s in Seattle